Tiefenbach is a river of Rhineland-Palatinate and Hesse, Germany. It flows into the Wisper near Lorch am Rhein.

See also
List of rivers of Hesse
List of rivers of Rhineland-Palatinate

Rivers of Rhineland-Palatinate
Rivers of Hesse
Rivers of the Taunus
Rivers of Germany